The 1st K-Drama Star Awards was an awards ceremony for excellence in television in South Korea. It was held at the Daejeon Convention Center in Daejeon on December 8, 2012. The nominees were chosen from Korean dramas that aired from October 1, 2011 to October 31, 2012.

The highest honor of the ceremony, Grand Prize (Daesang), was awarded to the actor Son Hyun-joo of the drama series The Chaser.

Nominations and winners

Winners are listed first, highlighted in boldface, and indicated with a dagger.

Notes

References

External links
 

APAN
APAN Star Awards
APAN Star Awards